Bass Point can refer to:
Bass Point (Australia), a headland on the New South Wales coast
Bass Point (England), a headland on the Cornwall coast